Catherine Dalling Taylor Stihler  (née Taylor; born 30 July 1973) is a Scottish former politician who is chief executive officer (CEO) of Creative Commons. A member of the Scottish Labour Party, she was a Member of the European Parliament (MEP) for Scotland from 1999 to 2019. 

After leaving the European Parliament, she first served as CEO of non-profit organisation Open Knowledge Foundation and from August 2020 as the CEO of Creative Commons.

In October 2014, she was elected as the 52nd rector of the University of St Andrews.

Early and personal life

Stihler was educated at Coltness High School, later going on to the University of St Andrews where she gained an MA with joint honours in International Relations and Geography and a postgraduate MLitt in International Security Studies.

Whilst a student at St Andrews, she was elected president of the Students' Association, serving from 1994–95. She also served on the Scottish Executive Committee of the Labour Party from 1993–95 and was the Young Labour delegate to the National Executive Committee from 1995–97. Whilst a postgraduate student, she stood at the Angus constituency  at the 1997 general election. She was not elected however, and finished in third place, behind Sebastian A.A. Leslie of the Conservatives and Andrew Welsh of the Scottish National Party.

Political career
Stihler worked for Anne Begg, Member of Parliament for Aberdeen South, as a researcher. She was placed at third on the Labour Party list for Scotland in the 1999 European Parliament election, and therefore took the third Labour Party seat under the d'Hondt electoral system becoming the UK's youngest MEP at the age of 25.

Stihler was re-elected as an MEP for Scotland in 2004 and 2009. She was the unsuccessful Labour candidate in the 2006 Dunfermline and West Fife by-election. She served as the Deputy Leader of the EPLP and held positions as Labour's Euro spokesperson on health and fisheries. Stihler was Labour's Euro-Spokesperson on Consumer Rights and was the only Scottish MEP on the economic and monetary affairs committee.

She supported Owen Smith in the 2016 Labour Party (UK) leadership election.

She resigned as an MEP on 31 January 2019, to take up a new role. Her seat was left vacant and not filled by The Scottish Labour Party due to the UK's [then] impending exit from The EU on 29 March 2019.

Stihler was appointed Officer of the Order of the British Empire (OBE) in the 2019 Birthday Honours.

Later career
In November 2018, Stihler was appointed as the new Chief Executive Officer of Open Knowledge Foundation. She stood down as an MEP on 31 January 2019 to take up the role in February 2019. On 9 July 2020, Creative Commons announced she would be the new CEO with a starting date of 17 August 2020. In 2022, she was elected Fellow of the Royal Society of Edinburgh.

References

External links

1973 births
Living people
People educated at Coltness High School
Alumni of the University of St Andrews
People from Bellshill
Scottish Labour MEPs
MEPs for Scotland 1999–2004
MEPs for Scotland 2004–2009
MEPs for Scotland 2009–2014
MEPs for Scotland 2014–2019
20th-century women MEPs for Scotland
21st-century women MEPs for Scotland
Labour Party (UK) parliamentary candidates
Officers of the Order of the British Empire
Politicians from North Lanarkshire
Fellows of the Royal Society of Edinburgh